Przezwody may refer to the following places:
Przezwody, Lesser Poland Voivodeship (south Poland)
Przezwody, Jędrzejów County in Świętokrzyskie Voivodeship (south-central Poland)
Przezwody, Sandomierz County in Świętokrzyskie Voivodeship (south-central Poland)